Kværnerparken is a park in the Kvaerner neighborhood of Oslo, Norway. 

The name of a park was used for a new residential area in the vicinity, Kvaerner Dalen.

References

Parks in Oslo
Gamle Oslo